Kyongnosla Alpine Sanctuary is a nature reserve in Gangtok district, Sikkim, India. It is situated around the area adjoining the Tsomgo (Changu) lake along the Nathula Road.

Rich in both flora and fauna, rare, endangered ground orchids and rhododendrons interspersed among tall junipers and taller silver firs are among the important plants present. Rhododendron niveum (the State Tree of Sikkim) and Cypripedium tibeticum (the ground slipper orchid), which is on the verge of extinction, have also been introduced here.

Kyongnosla Alpine Sanctuary is part of the Sacred Himalayan Landscape.

The best time to visit the sanctuary is in May, June, October and November, when the climate is pleasant, dry and warm.

References

Protected areas of Sikkim
Gangtok district
Wildlife sanctuaries in Sikkim
Protected areas established in 1977
1977 establishments in Sikkim